Little by Little may refer to:
 Eric, or, Little by Little, a children's novel by Frederic W. Farrar

Music
 Little by Little (musical), a 1999 Off-Broadway musical
 Little by Little (band), a Japanese rock band

Albums
 Little by Little..., a 2005 album by Harvey Danger
 Little by Little (Tommy Emmanuel album), a 2010 album by Australian guitarist Tommy Emmanuel
 Little by Little: Collectors Edition, a 1985 EP by Robert Plant

Songs
 "Little by Little", a song composed by Robert E. Dolan
 "Little by Little" (Robert Plant song), 1985
 "Little by Little" (Rolling Stones song), 1964
 "Little by Little" (Oasis song), 2002
 "Little by Little" (Laura and The Lovers song), 2005
 "Little by Little" (James House song), 1994
 "Little by Little", a song by Radiohead on the album The King of Limbs 
 "Little by Little", a song by Dusty Springfield
 "Little by Little", a song by Alice Cooper on his album Hey Stoopid
 "Little by Little", a song by Groove Armada from their Goodbye Country album
 "Little by Little", a song by Mel London
 "Little by Little", a 1956 song by Nappy Brown
 "Little by Little", a song by Supertramp on their album Slow Motion
 "Little by Little", a song by UB40 on their album Signing Off
 "Little by Little", a studio album by Lane 8, 2018